Muhammet Reis (born 27 October 1984) is a Turkish footballer who currently plays as a midfielder for Iğdır FK.

He has played for Turkey at the 2005 Mediterranean Games.

References

External links
 
 

1984 births
Living people
Sportspeople from Trabzon
Turkish footballers
Süper Lig players
Turkey under-21 international footballers
Turkey youth international footballers
TFF First League players
Kocaelispor footballers
Erzurumspor footballers
Balıkesirspor footballers
Gaziantep F.K. footballers
Kardemir Karabükspor footballers
Ankaraspor footballers
Giresunspor footballers
Association football midfielders
Mediterranean Games silver medalists for Turkey
Mediterranean Games medalists in football
Competitors at the 2005 Mediterranean Games